Vengeance of the West is a 1942 American Western film directed by Lambert Hillyer and written by Luci Ward. The film stars Wild Bill Elliott, Tex Ritter, Frank Mitchell, Adele Mara, Dick Curtis and Robert Fiske. The film was released on August 16, 1942, by Columbia Pictures.

Plot

Cast          
Wild Bill Elliott as Joaquin Murietta / The Black Shadow
Tex Ritter as Captain Tex Lake
Frank Mitchell as Cannonball Boggs
Adele Mara as Anita Morell
Dick Curtis as Jeff Gorman
Robert Fiske as Gil Kirby
Ted Mapes as Mason
Eva Puig as Maria
José Luis Tortosa as Florencio 
Guy Wilkerson as Long John

References

External links
 

1942 films
American Western (genre) films
1942 Western (genre) films
Columbia Pictures films
Films directed by Lambert Hillyer
American black-and-white films
1940s English-language films
1940s American films